Jeffrey Allan Coates (19 November 1925 – 18 June 2016) was an Australian politician.

Life and career
Coates was born in Deloraine on 19 November 1925. In 1971 he was elected to the Tasmanian Legislative Council as the independent member for Meander. He transferred to Tamar in 1982, and retired from politics in 1989.

Coates died on 18 June 2016, at the age of 90.

References

1925 births
2016 deaths
Independent members of the Parliament of Tasmania
Members of the Tasmanian Legislative Council